B.E.F. (British Electric Foundation) was a band/production company formed by former Human League members Martyn Ware and Ian Craig Marsh which became largely eclipsed by its best-known project, Heaven 17 (with lead singer Glenn Gregory).

History
Ware and Marsh's first release as B.E.F. in 1980, a collection of instrumentals entitled Music For Stowaways, was initially available only on cassette and was inspired by the appearance of the first Sony Walkman (at first marketed in the UK as the Sony Stowaway). There was also a vinyl release, Music For Listening To, mainly targeted for export sales, which was slightly truncated (though with the addition of a track not found on the cassette). In the late 1990s, a CD release with this title contained the complete contents from both versions.

In 1982, with Heaven 17 already established with Glenn Gregory as the lead vocalist, B.E.F. released an album entitled Music of Quality and Distinction Volume One on Virgin Records, which involved other artists covering classic songs. However, as this album came out before the 'age of the featured artist', the record was classed as a 'Various Artists' compilation, similar to albums released at the time by Ronco or K-Tel, and not a record by the British Electric Foundation, (so its number 25 placing in the UK Top 100 albums chart is seen as a hit for Virgin Records and not the B.E.F. or BEF).

The album's production was mainly in the Heaven 17/ B.E.F. style (i.e. synthesisers and LinnDrums) and featured Glenn Gregory covering Jimmy Webb's "Wichita Lineman" (made famous in a version recorded by country star Glen Campbell) and Lou Reed's "Perfect Day". This B.E.F.'s album also featured covers by Billy Mackenzie ("The Secret Life of Arabia" and "It's Over"), Paul Jones ("There's A Ghost In My House"), Paula Yates ("These Boots Are Made For Walkin'"), Gary Glitter ("Suspicious Minds"),  Bernie Nolan ("You Keep Me Hangin' On")., as well as "Anyone Who Had a Heart" by Sandie Shaw (a recording which was released as a single that charted at Number 71 in Australia), and "Ball of Confusion" (a recording of the Whitfield and Strong song by Tina Turner that drew the attention of Capitol Records, resulting in Turner being signed by the label. Her next single "Let's Stay Together" would be co-produced by Ware, and peaked at number six in the UK Singles Chart, making the US Top 20 also).

It was not until 1991 that a second volume appeared, with the album this time being handled by Ten Records through AVL (Associated Virgin Labels Limited) rather than by the main unit of Virgin Records. Music of Quality and Distinction Volume Two again featured Tina Turner (singing "A Change Is Gonna Come") and Billy Mackenzie (singing "Free"), whilst B.E.F.'s version of "Family Affair" gave them and singer Lalah Hathaway a Top 40 hit in the UK Singles Chart (this time credited to 'BEF featuring Lalah Hathaway'). Scritti Politti's Green Gartside was another guest on the album, performing "I Don't Know Why I Love You", a track recorded in the same set of sessions that included Scritti Politti's pop-reggae version of "She's a Woman" (featuring Shabba Ranks), a recording which became a Top 20 chart hit early in 1991.

Dark was released 27 May 2013, with Ware explaining the album would consist of very dark versions of tunes that have to be of a certain type. Basically it's dark reinterpretations, primarily looking at things differently from a lyrical point of view. It's almost like soundscape stuff, in much the same way as "You've Lost That Loving Feeling" on "Reproduction" was kind of like a soundscape.

First live performance
In March 2007 B.E.F. made their first live performance, as part of the line-up for the Tribute to Billy MacKenzie Concert held at Shepherds Bush Empire, London, in memory of their three-time guest vocalist, and in aid of Sound Seekers. The B.E.F. line-up consisted of Martyn Ware on keyboards, a guitarist/keyboardist and a bassist, with Glenn Gregory and Billie Godfrey, Heaven 17's female vocalist.

Setlist
 the aforementioned "Free"
 Heaven 17's "Let Me Go" (Gregory revealing that it was MacKenzie's favourite Heaven 17 track)
 a version of "Temptation" similar to the original demo, with guest vocalist Claudia Brücken (who was present with two other acts: Onetwo and Claudia Brücken/Andrew Poppy)
 David Bowie's "Drive-In Saturday" (another MacKenzie favourite)
 the Associates' "Party Fears Two" in a slower/stripped-down version.

Following this concert, the stripped-down cover of "Party Fears Two" was recorded in studio and was featured on Heaven 17's 2008 album Naked as Advertised.

Discography

References

External links
 

Official site

English electronic music duos
English new wave musical groups
New wave duos
Heaven 17
Musical groups from Sheffield
Virgin Records artists